USS Harold J. Ellison has been the name of more than one United States Navy ship, and may refer to:

, a destroyer escort cancelled during construction in 1944
, was a destroyer in commission from 1945 to 1983

United States Navy ship names